The Tuzla Canton is one of 10 cantons of the Federation of Bosnia and Herzegovina, one of two entities in Bosnia and Herzegovina. The cantonal seat is the city of Tuzla.

Municipalities

The Tuzla Canton comprises the following municipalities:

History and culture
The canton was created by the Washington Agreement in 1994, and its boundaries defined by the Dayton Agreement in 1995. Tuzla Canton was called Tuzla-Podrinje Canton until February 1999. Podrinje means ‘region near the river Drina’ but as the river did not flow through the Canton, a name change was authorised.

The Srebrenik Fortress is Bosnia's best-preserved medieval fort, dating from 1333 and is located in Srebrenik. The Panonian lake is a famous holiday resort for tourists.

Tuzla is the hip hop center of the Balkans due to Edo Maajka, Frenkie and the first hip hop station in Bosnia, which is located in Tuzla, FMJAM. Music artist guitarist Emir Hot, pianist Bešlić, accordionist Emir Vildić and violinist Selma Dizdarević are also from Tuzla. Famous singers Selma Bajrami and Lepa Brena were both born in Tuzla.

Demographics

2013 Census 
As of 2013 census, a total of 445,028 inhabitants lives in Tuzla Canton.

People from Tuzla Canton

Historical figures
Husein Gradaščević, military figure and leader of Bosnian uprising

Visual arts
Ismet Mujezinović, painter
Walter Neugebauer, comic book artist
Ljubomir Popović, painter
Nesim Tahirović, painter

Performing arts
Denis Avdić, comedian and radio host
Davor Janjić, actor
Maya Sar, singer-songwriter
Vladimir Valjarević, concert pianist

Literature
Julijana Matanović, writer
Meša Selimović, writer

Fashion
Andreja Pejić, model

Sports
Mirza Delibašić, basketball player
Amer Delić, tennis player
Elmedin Kikanović, basketball player
Svetlana Kitić, handball player
Mara Lakić, basketball player
Damir Mršić, basketball player
Razija Mujanović, basketball player
Damir Mulaomerović, basketball player
Jusuf Nurkić, basketball player
Zoran Pavlović, football player
Dragan Perić, track and field athlete
Andrea Petkovic, tennis player
Miralem Pjanić, football player
Ana Šimić, track and field athlete

Economy

Mining
 Breza coal mine
 Kreka coal mine

See also
 Political divisions of Bosnia and Herzegovina
 List of heads of the Tuzla Canton

References

 
Cantons of the Federation of Bosnia and Herzegovina